The Three Doctors is the first serial of the tenth season of the British science fiction television series Doctor Who, first broadcast in four weekly parts on BBC1 from 30 December 1972 to 20 January 1973.

In the serial, the solar engineer Omega (Stephen Thorne), the creator of the experiments that allowed the Time Lords to travel in time, seeks revenge on the Time Lords after he was left for dead in a universe made of antimatter. The Time Lords recruit the time travellers the First Doctor (William Hartnell), the Second Doctor (Patrick Troughton), and the Third Doctor (Jon Pertwee) for help when Omega drains their civilisation's power.

The serial opened the tenth anniversary year of the series, and features the first three Doctors all appearing in the same serial. This makes it the first Doctor Who story in which an earlier incarnation of the Doctor returns to the show. It was also Hartnell's last appearance as the First Doctor prior to his death in 1975.

Plot
A superluminal signal is sent to Earth, carrying with it an energy blob that seems intent on capturing the Doctor. The homeworld of the Time Lords is also under siege, their power being drained through a black hole. Trapped themselves, and desperate to send help, the Time Lords do the unthinkable, breaking the First Law of Time by recruiting a previous incarnation of the Doctor from his own past. As the Second Doctor cannot get along with the present Third Doctor, they attempt to retrieve the First Doctor to "keep them in order", but he is trapped in a "time eddy", unable to fully materialise, communicating through a viewscreen. 

The Doctors investigate, while UNIT headquarters faces an attack by shapeless blob-like creatures. The First Doctor realises that the black hole is a bridge between universes, so they allow the TARDIS to be swallowed up by the energy creature, finding themselves in an antimatter universe created by the legendary Time Lord Omega, a solar engineer who created the supernova that powers Time Lord civilisation, but which also supposedly killed him. In fact, he remains trapped in his antimatter universe, whose reality is maintained by his will alone (or as described by Omega himself, the "...Atlas of [his] world..."). 

Omega seeks revenge on those who he imagines left him stranded, and intends for the Doctors to take his place maintaining the reality of his antimatter universe. When Omega prepares to leave with the help of the Second and Third Doctors, they are horrified to discover that exposure to the effects of the black hole's singularity have destroyed Omega's physical body: he cannot leave, for the existence of his essence is also only maintained by his will as well (an "I think, therefore I am" situation); the moment he relinquishes control, he and the antimatter universe will cease to exist. Omega now demands that the Doctors share his exile.

The two Doctors, with the help of the First, propose a way to deceive Omega, by offering him a force field generator. In a rage at this paltry offer, Omega knocks it over and the Second Doctor's recorder falls out of it (having fallen into it earlier, thus remaining unconverted positive matter), annihilating everything it meets in the antimatter universe in a flash, returning the Doctors in the TARDIS, and all the stolen structures and objects, to their universe. With the Time Lords' power restored, they return the First and Second Doctors to their respective time periods. 

Forlorn, The Doctor reflects on the recent events. The Third Doctor explains to Jo that death was the only freedom anyone could offer Omega. Out of forgiveness, the Time Lords then send the Third Doctor a new dematerialisation circuit for the TARDIS and restore his knowledge of how to travel through space and time.

Production
Working titles for this story included The Black Hole. The script was originally supposed to feature all three Doctors equally, but William Hartnell was too ill to be able to play the full role as envisioned. He was, therefore, reduced to a pre-recorded cameo role, appearing only on the TARDIS's scanner and the space-time viewer of the Time Lords. It would be the last time he played the Doctor and his last acting role before his death in 1975. Hartnell's scenes were filmed at BBC's Ealing Studios. 

The only time that all three Doctors appeared together was in promotional photos for the story. One session of these took place in October 1972 at a photo studio in Battersea - this produced the image that was used for the cover of the Radio Times magazine to promote the story.

The production team also planned for Frazer Hines to reprise his role of Jamie McCrimmon alongside the Second Doctor; however, Hines was not available, due to his work on the soap opera Emmerdale Farm. Much of the role originally intended for Jamie was reassigned to Sergeant Benton.

Casting notes
The Chancellor is portrayed by Clyde Pollitt, who had also played one of the Time Lords who tried and exiled the Second Doctor. Barry Letts states in the DVD commentary that this was intentional, as he meant for this to be the same character. Similarly, Graham Leaman reappears as a Time Lord, having been seen in the same role in Colony in Space (1971) discussing the Master's activities and the Time Lords' use of the exiled Doctor as an agent. The same DVD commentary and the on-screen production captions note that the unavailability of actor Richard Franklin led to a shifting of the roles by the UNIT supporting cast. Sergeant Benton took on the majority of the role written for Captain Yates and a new character, Corporal Palmer, took on most of the lines originally written for Benton.

Reception

Patrick Mulkern of Radio Times wrote that The Three Doctors "may not be the greatest story ever told" but it ended the Doctor's exile on Earth and brought back Troughton, though unfortunately Hartnell was not able to do much. The A.V. Club reviewer Christopher Bahn summarised that the serial "has some good ideas in it, but they're treated with such an unambitious lack of imagination that there's not enough actually happening here for the story to be offensively bad—just boring". He felt the "most enjoyable part" was the "comic squabbling" between Pertwee and Troughton, and also called the Brigadier a "saving grace". DVD Talk's Ian Jane gave the serial three out of five stars, noting that it was "slightly silly" and the production designs and special effects were "definitely not the best that the series has had to offer". He also felt that the story was wrapped up too quickly and was "fairly predictable". However, he praised Pertwee and Troughton's interplay, the fact that Jo was given more to do, and Stephen Thorne's performance as Omega. Alisdair Wilkins of io9 picked The Three Doctors as the worst Doctor Who story of the classic series, feeling that the Second Doctor and the Brigadier were written as too comical, the story had too much padding, and that Omega was a "shouting, one-dimensional villain".

Broadcast

The serial was repeated on BBC2 in November 1981, daily (Monday–Thursday) (23 November 1981 to 26 November 1981) at 17:40 as part of "The Five Faces of Doctor Who". The four episodes achieved ratings of 5.0, 4.5, 5.7 and 5.8 million viewers respectively.

Commercial releases

In print

A novelisation of this serial, written by Terrance Dicks, was published by Target Books in November 1975.

The novelisation provides a rationale for Omega's realm to be a quarry: Over the millennia, Omega has become weary of the mental effort required to generate a verdant landscape and now makes do with rock and soil. The Second Doctor is referred to throughout as Doctor Two. In the book, Mr Ollis is renamed Mr Hollis.

Home media
The Three Doctors was released twice on VHS, first in August 1991 and thereafter remastered and re-released in 2002 as part of the WHSmith's The Time Lord Collection boxed set. It was released on DVD in the UK in November 2003 as part of the Doctor Who 40th Anniversary Celebration releases, representing the Jon Pertwee years. Some copies came in a box set housing a limited edition Corgi model of "Bessie", the Third Doctor's vintage roadster. A special edition of the DVD, with new bonus features, was released in the UK on 13 February 2012 in the third of the ongoing Revisitations DVD box sets with additional bonus features.
In 2019, The Three Doctors was released as part of the Season Ten Boxed Set Blu-Ray collection. The story and its special features occupy one disc in the set, and include features from previous releases and specially-made content.

References

External links

Target novelisation

First Doctor serials
Second Doctor serials
Third Doctor serials
Doctor Who multi-Doctor stories
Doctor Who serials novelised by Terrance Dicks
1972 British television episodes
1973 British television episodes
Anniversary television episodes
Television episodes written by Bob Baker (scriptwriter)
Fiction about black holes